Malcolm and Alwyn were a popular British gospel beat music group in the 1970s. They played rock music influenced by Simon and Garfunkel, Bob Dylan and The Beatles with lyrics reflecting their conversion to Christianity. The duo was composed of Malcolm Wild and Alwyn Wall, who had been performing together in a band called The Zodiacs prior to their conversion. Malcolm and Alwyn recorded two albums in the early '70s before they disbanded in 1976, and a live reunion album in 1981 before again parting ways. The live album was recorded on 24 January 1981 at Calvary Chapel, Costa Mesa, California, U.S. Both Malcolm and Alwyn released solo albums following the group's disbanding.  Alwyn Wall featured on Larry Norman's 1981 live Friends on Tour album.

Career
Their 1973 debut album Fool's Wisdom sported a stellar cast of session musicians including John Wetton of King Crimson on bass, Rod Edwards and Roger Hand of Edwards Hand on keyboards and percussion, veteran drummer Clem Cattini, and guitarist Mickey Keen of Hudson Ford. Edwards Hand and Mickey Keen also appeared on Malcolm and Alwyn's follow-up album, Wildwall.

Wild is currently senior pastor of Calvary Chapel in Merritt Island, Florida, and still performs with the Calvary Chapel Worship Band as well as operating a record label, Footstep Records. He also ministers via radio with the program "Sound Truth". Wall is currently senior pastor at Calvary Chapel in Westminster, London, England.

Discography

Albums 
 Fool's Wisdom (Pye NSPL-18404, 1973, review)
 Wildwall (Key Records KL 022, 1974, review)
 Malcolm and Alwyn – Live! (MRC MRC 007, 1981, review)

Solo 
 The Alwyn Wall Band (solo), The Prize (Myrrh MSB-6596, 1977)
 Malcolm Wild (solo), Broken Chains (Grapevine GRV-131, 1979)
 Malcolm [Wild] and the Mirrors (solo), Red Alert (A&S Records AS0004, 1982)
 Alwyn Wall (solo), Invisible Warfare (Chapel Lane, CLS-8009, 1981)

Songs on compilations 
 Love, Joy, Peace, "Fool's Wisdom" (Various Artists, Myrrh MYR-6540, 1974)
 Jubilation!, "Tomorrow's News" (Various Artists, Myrrh MST-6555, 1975)
 Jubilation, Too, "I Love" (Various Artists, Myrrh MST-6568, 1976)

References

External links 
 Malcolm and Alwyn on Myspace
 Fool's Wisdom at Christian Music Archive. Retrieved 25 April 2009.
 Jubilation, Too at Christian Music Archive. Retrieved 25 April 2009.

Living people
British gospel beat music groups
Performers of contemporary Christian music
Musical groups established in 1969
1969 establishments in the United Kingdom
Musical groups disestablished in 1976
Myrrh Records artists
1976 disestablishments in the United Kingdom
Year of birth missing (living people)